Grand/LATTC station  is an at-grade light rail station on the A Line of the Los Angeles Metro Rail system. The station is located in the median of Washington Boulevard at its intersection with Grand Avenue, after which the station is named, along with Los Angeles Trade–Technical College (LATTC). One of the station's exits leads directly to the LATTC campus. The station also has nearby stops for the J Line of the Los Angeles Metro Busway system, southbound buses stop at the intersection of Flower Street and Washington Boulevard, one block to the west of the station, and northbound buses stop at the intersection of Figueroa Street and Washington Boulevard, two blocks to the west. In addition to the LATTC campus, the station also serves the South Los Angeles neighborhood.

Service

Station layout

Hours and frequency

Connections 
, the following connections are available: 
 LADOT DASH: D, Pico Union/Echo Park

Notable places nearby 
The station is within walking distance of the following notable places:
 Grand Olympic Auditorium
 Mount St. Mary's College, Doheny Campus
 Lanterman High School
 Los Angeles Trade Technical College
 Los Angeles Orthopedic Hospital
 Los Angeles County Superior Court, Metropolitan Courthouse
 St. Vincent de Paul Roman Catholic Church

References

A Line (Los Angeles Metro) stations
Railway stations in the United States opened in 1990
Railway stations in California at university and college campuses
Downtown Los Angeles
1990 establishments in California